Craig Berkey (born June 18, 1962) is a Canadian sound engineer. He has been nominated for three Academy Awards. He has worked on over 80 films since 1990.

Selected filmography
 No Country for Old Men (2007) - Best Sound Mixing
 True Grit (2010) - Sound Editing and Best Sound Mixing

References

External links

1962 births
Living people
Canadian audio engineers
People from Burnaby